Arerieva Adede Tony Marioghae (born October 1, 1970) is the president of The Evangelical Ark Mission (TEAM) International. He is a conference speaker, reformer, educator, consultant and author.

Education 
Tony Marioghae graduated from the University of Jos, Nigeria with a diploma in mass communications in 1995 and bachelor's degree in political science in 2000. He also obtained a Master of Arts and a Doctor of Philosophy in transformational leadership from the Northwestern Christian University, Philippines.

Activism and ministry 
In 2005, Tony Marioghae and the Regional Director for TEAM Asia, Ricardo Sio launched the global “Shine Philippines” Movement, a Non-Government Organization (NGO) which champions the spiritual reformation and the national transformation of institutions in Philippines.

Marioghae was appointed by Gov. Rafael P. Nantes Special Adviser to the Governor of Quezon province, Philippines, and a consultant to the provincial government; he held this position from 2007 to 2010. He worked promoting tourism in the province.

In November 8, 2008, he was named Bishop by the Christian Bishops and Ministers Association of the Philippines (CBMAP) in collaboration with Eagles World Evangelism Council of Bishops (EWECOB). He was the youngest Evangelical Pentecostal Minister consecrated in the Philippines. He was also the first African to be ordained by CBMAP.

In 2012 he built in Lucena City the first Pentecostal Christian Cathedral in the Philippines.

Recognitions and achievements  
 Activist of the Year 2000 by the Department of Political Science, University of Jos, Nigeria
 2007: Certificate of Appreciation by De La Salle - College of Saint Benilde, Manila, Republic of the Philippines
 2007: Certificate of Appreciation by the Holy Spirit Revival Movement International, Singapore
 2010: Certificate of Appreciation by the Philippine National Police Headquarters
 2011: Certificate of Appreciation by the Municipality of Santol
 2011: Doctor of Divinity (Honoris Causa) by Theology University, Quezon City, Republic of the Philippines
 2011: Doctor of International Relations (Honoris Causa) by Zoe Life Theological College, Philadelphia, USA
 2013: Doctor of Philosophy in Transformational Leadership (Honoris Causa) by Northwestern Christian University, Philippines
 2014: The Prestigious Key to Lucena City 
 2014: Dakilang Ama Award (Honorable Father) Republic of the Philippines
 2015: Honorary Citizenship Award,  Marinduque Province of the Republic of the Philippines
 2015: Certificate of Appreciation by the Embassy of Nigeria, Republic of the Philippines

Books 
  There is a miracle in your storm  - Tehilah's Creation Publishing, Philippines, 2003
  Think Abundance. Learn the Secret and Achieve Big Things  - 1st published by Maximum Impact Consult, Nigeria, 2006
  Precepts of Wisdom  - Tehilah's Creation Publishing, Philippines, 2013 - 
  Saved and Empowered  - Tehilah's Creation Publishing, Philippines, 2014 -

References 

Living people
1970 births
Nigerian Pentecostal pastors
University of Jos alumni
Pentecostal missionaries
Protestant missionaries in the Philippines
21st-century Nigerian writers